St. Andrew's Episcopal Church is a historic church at 300 3rd Street in Elyria, Ohio.

It was built in 1872 and added to the National Register of Historic Places in 1979.

References

Churches completed in 1872
Episcopal churches in Ohio
Churches on the National Register of Historic Places in Ohio
Gothic Revival church buildings in Ohio
Churches in Elyria, Ohio
Churches in Lorain County, Ohio
National Register of Historic Places in Lorain County, Ohio
19th-century Episcopal church buildings